Ngora High School is a secondary boarding school for boys and girls in the Ngora institutional complex, Ngora District, Uganda. As of 2015, the school had 1357 students enrolled in class. It is one of the oldest educational establishments in Uganda, founded in 1914 by Anglican missionaries. Ngora High school provides a wide variety of classes at both O and A levels.  It is one of the most academically distinguished schools in the region.

Purpose 

The school's mission is to inculcate in its students a strict moral conscience and the values of commitment, competence, responsibility, discipline, truthfulness, self-motivation, and respect. The school motto is "Iponesio Ka Akukuranut", meaning "Discipline and Hard Work."

History 

Ngora High School was founded on July 13, 1914, by the Anglican Church of Uganda to educate high-minded professionals. It recently celebrated its 100-year anniversary. The Archbishop of the Church of Uganda, Stanley Ntagali, led prayers at the celebrations attended by Education, Science, Technology and Sports minister Jessica Alupo. Also in attendance was Minister Without Portfolio Richard Todwong, who represented his excellence Yoweri Museveni, president of Uganda.
 In the years after its founding, Ngora High School was one of Uganda's première schools, with students from the surrounding districts competing to attend. However, the hardships of the Teso Insurgency (1986 - 1993) and the incursion of the Lord's Resistance Army (2001 - 2003), combined to damage both the physical premises of the school and its academic reputation. During this time, it was the site of battles between government forces and the rebels. When there was no fighting, it was used as a camp for displaced persons. Many students and teachers relocated to safety in other areas. After the violence ended, the school was left with fewer than ten teachers on a war-battered campus.

Ngora High School has made a gradual recovery, admitting more students and hiring more teachers. Now it is once again one of the top schools in the country, with its students performing very well in Uganda Certificate of Education exams  and winning the 2011 Secondary Schools Science Fair against competition from 24 other schools.

Religious Life in Ngora High 
Ngora High School permits freedom of worship.  Students of Anglican faith (Church of Uganda) pray in St. Andrews Chapel which is directly opposite the Administration Block in the Boys Wing. Meanwhile, students of other faiths, including Catholics and Pentecostals, too conduct their prayers in designated rooms located in the Boys wing.

Classes and staff

Ngora High School provides its students with a rich curriculum of study subjects and co-curricular activities. Principal subjects at A level are divinity, history, biology, fine art, physics, chemistry, agriculture, geography, economics, mathematics, English literature, and entrepreneurship education. Subsidiary A courses include General Paper, Subsidiary ICT and Subsidiary Mathematics.

The O level class offerings are Fine Art, History, Biology, Physics, Ateso, Chemistry, Geography, Agriculture, Commerce, Mathematics, English Language and Literature, Computer Studies, Foods and Nutrition, Entrepreneurship, Principles of Accounting, and Christian Religious Education.

Ngora High School also integrates deaf students into its regular program of classes with the assistance of government-funded interpreting services.

The current head teacher is Mr. Okiria Martin Obore, while the deputy head teachers are Mr. Osuu John Robert and Mr. Omadi John Robert. The Director of Studies is Mr. Odeke Michael, and the Alumni Chairman is Mr. Kenneth G. Oluka.

Co-curricular activities

Students are encouraged to take part in co-curricular activities with athletics such as volleyball, netball, and football. The boys football team competes at district and regional levels in competitions such as the 2015 Copa Coca-Cola Championship.

Alumni

Jessica Alupo - Vice President of Uganda
Agnes Akiror - State Minister for Teso Affairs in the Cabinet of Uganda, 
Rose Akol Okullu - Minister of Internal Affairs 
Paul Amoru - media practitioner, public speaker and politician
Jeje Odongo - State Minister for Defense 
David Abala - Member of Parliament, Ngora County

References

External links 

Location of Ngora High School - on Google Maps

Ngora District
Schools in Uganda
Educational institutions established in 1914
1914 establishments in Uganda